1729 is the natural number following 1728 and preceding 1730. It is a taxicab number, and is variously known as Ramanujan's number and the Ramanujan-Hardy number, after an anecdote of the British mathematician G. H. Hardy when he visited Indian mathematician Srinivasa Ramanujan in hospital. He related their conversation:

The two different ways are:

 1729 = 13 + 123 = 93 + 103

The quotation is sometimes expressed using the term "positive cubes", since allowing negative perfect cubes (the cube of a negative integer) gives the smallest solution as 91 (which is a divisor of 1729; 1991 = 1729).

91 = 63 + (−5)3 = 43 + 33

Numbers that are the smallest number that can be expressed as the sum of two cubes in n distinct ways have been dubbed "taxicab numbers". The number was also found in one of Ramanujan's notebooks dated years before the incident, and was noted by Frénicle de Bessy in 1657.  A commemorative plaque now appears at the site of the Ramanujan-Hardy incident, at 2 Colinette Road in Putney.

The same expression defines 1729 as the first in the sequence of "Fermat near misses"  defined, in reference to Fermat's Last Theorem, as numbers of the form  which are also expressible as the sum of two other cubes.

Other properties
1729 is also the third Carmichael number, the first Chernick–Carmichael number , and the first absolute Euler pseudoprime.  It is also a sphenic number.

1729 is also the third Zeisel number. It is a centered cube number, as well as a dodecagonal number, a 24-gonal and 84-gonal number.

Investigating pairs of distinct integer-valued quadratic forms that represent every integer the same number of times, Schiemann found that such quadratic forms must be in four or more variables, and the least possible discriminant of a four-variable pair is 1729.

1729 is the lowest number which can be represented by a Loeschian quadratic form  in four different ways with a and b positive integers. The integer pairs (a,b) are (25,23), (32,15), (37,8) and (40,3).

1729 is the dimension of the Fourier transform on which the fastest known algorithm for multiplying two numbers is based. This is an example of a galactic algorithm.

See also
 A Disappearing Number, a March 2007 play about Ramanujan in England during World War I.
 Interesting number paradox
 4104, the second positive integer which can be expressed as the sum of two positive cubes in two different ways.

References

External links
 
 
 Why does the number 1729 show up in so many Futurama episodes?, io9.com

Integers
Srinivasa Ramanujan